Arthur James Tyler (26 December 1883 – 20 July 1972) was an Australian politician.

He was born in Newcastle, New South Wales. In 1943 he was elected to the Tasmanian Legislative Council as the Labor member for Hobart. His victory had been by only three votes and was declared void by the Supreme Court on a challenge; Tyler won the resulting by-election in January 1944. He was, however, defeated in 1945. He died in Hobart in 1972.

References

1883 births
1972 deaths
Members of the Tasmanian Legislative Council
People from New South Wales
Australian Labor Party members of the Parliament of Tasmania
20th-century Australian politicians